The Antietam School District is a diminutive, suburban public school district that serves the Borough of Mount Penn and Lower Alsace Township in Berks County, Pennsylvania. According to a federal census, it served a resident population of 7,494. In 2009, the district residents’ per capita income was $22,716, while the median family income was $49,511. In the Commonwealth, the median family income was $49,501  and the United States median family income was $49,445, in 2010.

Antietam School District operates three schools: Antietam Middle/Sr High School (7th–12th), Mount Penn Elementary Center (2nd–6th) and Mount Penn Primary Center (K-1st).

Extracurriculars
Antietam School District offers a variety of clubs, activities and interscholastic athletics. Antietam School District and Exeter Township School District operate a cooperative sports agreement  for 11 sports for both boys and girls, including football, wrestling, swimming and diving and cross country.  Costs are significant. The program started in 1985–1986 school year.

Sports
The District funds:

Boys
Baseball - A
Basketball- A
Bowling - AAAA
Cross country (with ETSD)
Football (with MSD)
Golf - AA
Indoor Track and Field (with ETSD)
Lacrosse - (with ETSD)
Soccer JV/V - A
Swimming and Diving - (with ETSD)
Track and Field (with ETSD)
Volleyball - AA
Wrestling - (with ETSD)

Girls
Basketball - A
Bowling - AAAA
Cross country (with ETSD)
Field Hockey (with ETSD)
Golf - AA
Indoor Track and Field (with ETSD)
Lacrosse - (with ETSD)
Soccer (Fall) - A
Softball - A
Swimming and Diving - (with ETSD)
Girls' Tennis - AA
Track and Field (with ETSD)
Volleyball JV/V - A

Middle School Sports:

Boys
Baseball 
Basketball
Soccer

Girls
Basketball
Field Hockey
Soccer (Fall)
Softball 

According to PIAA directory July 2012

References

School districts in Berks County, Pennsylvania